Sultan sa Barongis, officially the Municipality of Sultan sa Barongis (Maguindanaon: Ingud nu Sultan sa Barongis; Iranun: Inged a Sultan sa Barongis), is a 2nd class municipality in the province of Maguindanao del Sur, Philippines. According to the 2020 census, it has a population of 24,476 people.

Lambayong, Cotabato was created through Executive No. 543, signed by then President Elpidio Quirino on October 29, 1952. It is carved from the municipality of Dulawan (now Datu Piang).

Lambayong was changed to its current name on June 21, 1959.

In 2004, 11 barangays of Sultan sa Barongis were transferred to the newly created municipality of Rajah Buayan, Maguindanao, reducing the number of barangays from 23 to 12.

Geography

Barangays
Sultan sa Barongis is politically subdivided into 12 barangays.

 Angkayamat
 Barurao
 Bulod
 Darampua
 Gadungan
 Kulambog
 Langgapanan
 Masulot
 Papakan
 Tugal
 Tukanakuden
 Paldong

Climate

Demographics

Economy

See also
List of renamed cities and municipalities in the Philippines

References

External links
 Sultan sa Barongis Profile at the DTI Cities and Municipalities Competitive Index
 [ Philippine Standard Geographic Code]
 Local Governance Performance Management System

Municipalities of Maguindanao del Sur
Establishments by Philippine executive order